Bohemia competed at the 1912 Summer Olympics in Stockholm, Sweden, for the last time.  Beginning at the 1920 Olympic Games, Bohemian athletes would compete for the new nation of Czechoslovakia. Until 1918 Bohemia was part of Austria-Hungary.

At this games, the Bohemian team paraded behind a flag which consisted of the arms of the Kingdom of Bohemia on a white field. In the event of a Bohemian medallist, a Bohemian streamer would be displayed above the Flag of Austria; in the end, this did not occur as Bohemia won no medals.

Athletics

11 athletes competed for Bohemia in 1912. It was the country's third appearance in athletics, having competed in the sport each time the nation appeared at the Olympics. František Janda-Suk, whose silver medal in the discus throw in 1900 was Bohemia's best result in Olympic history and the nation's only athletics medal, placed 15th in that event. That result was the best placing Bohemia got in 1912.

Ranks given are within that athlete's heat.

Cycling

5 cyclists represented Bohemia. It was the second appearance of the nation in cycling, in which Bohemia had previously competed in 1900. Bohumil Rameš had the best time in the time trial, the only race held, placing 63rd. Since only three of the five cyclists finished, Bohemia received no ranking in the team competition which required four valid times.

Road cycling

Fencing

Thirteen fencers represented Bohemia. It was the second appearance of the nation in fencing, in which Bohemia had previous competed in 1908. Three of the fencers on the 1908 team returned. Vilém Goppold, who had won Bohemia's lone individual medal in 1908 with a bronze in the sabre, competed again, this time alongside two sons, Karel and Vilém, Jr. The sabre team, which had also won a bronze medal in 1908, was the only Bohemian fencing entry to reach the finals in 1912; the team lost all three of its round-robin matches in the final to finish in fourth place.

Gymnastics

A single gymnast, Bohumil Honzátko, represented Bohemia. He placed 36th in the men's individual all-around—exactly matching his performance from 1908. It was Bohemia's third appearance in gymnastics.

Artistic

Rowing 

One rower represented Bohemia. It was the nation's only appearance in rowing. Šourek did not finish his heat in the first round, abandoning the race after it became clear that he would lose.

(Ranks given are within each crew's heat.)

Tennis 

Eight tennis players represented Bohemia at the 1912 Games. It was the nation's third appearance in tennis, in which Bohemia had competed each time the nation had appeared at the Olympics.

The Bohemian team was unable to capture any medals, though Žemla-Rázný twice advanced to the semifinals: once in the outdoor singles and once with Just in the outdoor doubles. Both times the Bohemian side lost the semifinal and the bronze medal match that followed to finish fourth.

 Men

Wrestling

Greco-Roman
Bohemia sent four wrestlers in 1912. It was the nation's second Olympic wrestling appearance, with the nation not having competed in the Olympics in 1896 or 1904 and wrestling not having been on the programme in 1900. The team, compiling an aggregate 7–8 record, had much better success than Bohemia's first wrestling team, which went 0–4. Balej had the best result of any Bohemian wrestler, advancing to the sixth round before suffering his second loss and consequent elimination.

References
Official Olympic Reports

Nations at the 1912 Summer Olympics
1912
1912 in Austria-Hungary
Olympics